The fifth series of Dancing on Ice aired from 10 January to 28 March 2010 on ITV, with a preview show on 8 January 2010.

Phillip Schofield and Holly Willoughby returned as main presenters, while Karen Barber, Nicky Slater, Jason Gardiner and Robin Cousins returned to the "Ice Panel". Emma Bunton joined the panel as a replacement for Ruthie Henshall. Barber acted as head judge for weeks 6 and 7 due to Cousins commentating on the 2010 Winter Olympics in Vancouver, with Michael Ball and Angela Rippon appearing as guest judges in these weeks. This was the last series to feature Slater as a full-time judge, though he returned as a guest judge for two weeks in the ninth series in 2014.

For this series only, a spin-off show aired on Friday evenings on ITV, called Dancing on Ice: Friday. It was presented by Ben Shephard and Coleen Nolan.

The series was won by former Emmerdale actress Hayley Tamaddon, with Daniel Whiston as the professional winner. The Bill actor Gary Lucy finished second, with Hollyoaks actor Kieron Richardson third.

Couples
The contestants for the fifth series were:

Scoring chart 

Green scores indicate the highest skating score of the week.
Red scores indicate the lowest skating score of the week.
 indicates the couple eliminated that week
 indicates the returning couple that finished in the bottom two/three
 indicates the winning couple
 indicates the runner-up couple
 indicates the third-place couple
"—" indicates the couple that did not skate that week

Average score chart 
This table only counts for dances scored on a traditional 30 points scale.

Live show details

Results summary
Colour key

 Bunton and Cousins did not need to vote as there was already a majority.
 Cousins did not need to vote as there was already a majority. 
 Cousins was absent for weeks 6 and 7 due to commentating the 2010 Winter Olympics in Vancouver, Canada. Michael Ball and Angela Rippon replaced him for weeks 6 and 7, respectively.
 Ball and Barber did not need to vote as there was already a majority.
 Gardiner and Barber did not need to vote as there was already a majority.

Week 1 (10 January)
Note: Only the female celebrities skated this week

Judges' votes to save
Barber: Sharron & Pavel
Slater: Sharron & Pavel
Gardiner: Sharron & Pavel
Bunton: Sinitta & Andrei
Cousins: Sharron & Pavel

Week 2 (17 January)
Note: Only the male celebrities skated this week
Special musical guest: The Saturdays—"Ego"

Judges' votes to save
Barber: Gary & Maria
Slater: Gary & Maria
Gardiner: Gary & Maria
Bunton: Gary & Maria
Cousins': Gary & Maria

Week 3 (24 January)
Required element: Pairs spiral

Judges' votes to save
Barber: Sharron & Pavel
Slater: Sharron & Pavel
Gardiner: Sharron & Pavel
Bunton: Sharron & Pavel
Cousins: Sharron & Pavel

Week 4 (31 January)
Required element: Step combination

Judges' votes to save
Barber: Danny & Frankie
Slater: Danny & Frankie
Gardiner: Danny & Frankie
Bunton: Danny & Frankie
Cousins: Danny & Frankie

Week 5 (7 February)
Required element: Pairs spin
Special musical guest: Mumford & Sons—"The Cave"

Judges' votes to save
Barber: Kieron & Brianne
Slater: Heather & Matt
Gardiner: Kieron & Brianne
Bunton: Kieron & Brianne
Cousins: Kieron & Brianne

Week 6 (14 February)
Required element: Shadow step sequence
Theme: Valentine's Day
Note: Michael Ball replaces Cousins for the week whilst he is away commentating at the 2010 Winter Olympics in Vancouver.

Judges' votes to save
Slater: Danny & Frankie
Bunton: Danny & Frankie
Gardiner: Danny & Frankie
Ball: Danny & Frankie
Barber: Danny & Frankie

Week 7 (21 February)
Required element: Individual opening and closing position
Note: Angela Rippon also replaces Cousins for the week within his absence

Judges' votes to save
Bunton: Emily & Fred
Slater: Emily & Fred
Rippon: Emily & Fred
Gardiner: Emily & Fred
Barber: Emily & Fred

Week 8 (28 February)
Required element: Unassisted jump

Judges' votes to save
Barber: Danniella & Matthew
Slater: Emily & Fred
Gardiner: Danniella & Matthew
Bunton: Danniella & Matthew
Cousins: Danniella & Matthew

Week 9 (7 March)
 Required element: Solo spin
 Theme: Movie week

Judges' votes to save
Barber: Danniella & Matthew
Slater: Mikey & Melanie
Gardiner: Mikey & Melanie
Bunton: Danniella & Matthew
Cousins: Danniella & Matthew

Week 10 (14 March)
Required element: Skating with a prop

Judges' votes to save
Barber: Danny & Frankie
Slater: Kieron & Brianne
Gardiner: Kieron & Brianne
Bunton: Kieron & Brianne
Cousins: Kieron & Brianne

Week 11: Semi-Final (21 March)
Required element: Solo Skate

Judges' votes to save
Barber: Gary & Maria
Slater: Gary & Maria
Gardiner: Danniella & Matthew
Bunton: Danniella & Matthew
Cousins': Gary & Maria

Week 12: Finale (28 March)
 Required element: Flying

Ratings

DVD release

Dancing on Ice Series 5 was made available on DVD from 12 April 2010 in the United Kingdom. The DVD only featured highlights from the series, including interviews and previously unseen footage.

References 

Series 05
2010 British television seasons